Redroofs Theatre School is an independent part-time theatre training school in Maidenhead, Berkshire, England.

The school was established in 1947 in London and moved to Littlewick Green in 1964 into a house that was once the home of Ivor Novello. The school currently has two bases in Maidenhead, and two theatres in Littlewick Green and Ascot respectively. Redroofs is a part-time school of approximately 400 and an agency open to all pupils. In 2020 the school stopped its academic provision to become a larger Part Time School for the Performing Arts only.

Former pupils include Kate Winslet, Joanne Froggatt, Kris Marshall, Dani Harmer and many other working industry performers, dance teachers, theatre producers, theatre directors, writers, stage managers, singers, dancers, stunt coordinators and actors.

Former pupils 

Alumni include:
Ali Bastian - actress
Lucy Benjamin - actress
Tara Bethan - actress
Daniel Brocklebank - actor
Matthew Cottle - actor
Zara Dawson - actress/presenter
Jessica Fox - actress
Joanne Froggatt - actress
Dani Harmer - actress
Jessica Henwick - actress
Kris Marshall - actor
Ross McCall - actor
John O'Farrell - writer/broadcaster
Richard Reid - actor
Colin Teague - director
Kate Winslet – actress
Marcus D'Amico - actor
Kerry Ingram - child actor, winner of Olivier Award for Matilda the Musical 2012

References

External links 
Redroofs Theatre School website

Educational institutions established in 1947
Drama schools in the United Kingdom
1947 establishments in England
Ivor Novello